Fissiscapus is a genus of South American dwarf spiders that was first described by Alfred Frank Millidge in 1991.  it contains only three species, all found in Colombia and Ecuador: F. attercop, F. fractus, and F. pusillus.

See also
 List of Linyphiidae species (A–H)

References

Araneomorphae genera
Linyphiidae
Spiders of South America